Nele Kantule Iguibilikinya (1868–1944) was a famous chief and medicine man of the Kuna indigenous tribe of Panama.

Biography
He was born in Putorgandi, in what is today Ustupu Island, Panama. He was a leader of the Kuna from early in the twentieth century until his death.

His life was described by Erland Nordenskiöld, in his 1938 book on the Kuna, An historical and ethnological survey of the Cuna Indians.

References

Further reading
Picture-writing and other documents by Néle, paramount chief of the Cuna Indians and Reuben Pérez Kantule, his secretary; published by Erland Nordenskiöld (1928–1930)
James Howe (1998), A People Who Would Not Kneel: Panama, the United States, and the San Blas Kuna

External links
The University of Texas Press
 Indianer-wiki page

Indigenous leaders of the Americas
Indigenous religious leaders of the Americas
Kuna people
Colombian people of Kuna descent
Panamanian people of Kuna descent
1868 births
1944 deaths
Folk healers